Monona is a city in Clayton County, Iowa, United States. The population was 1,471 at the time of the 2020 census.

History
The name Monona is of American native origin.

In 1916, Monona contained a public house, two stores, and several mechanic shops.

Geography
Monona is located at  (43.051258, -91.390529).

Demographics

2010 census
At the 2010 census there were 1,549 people, 675 households, and 440 families living in the city. The racial makeup of the city was 98.3% White, 0.5% African American, 0.1% Native American, 0.3% Asian, 0.3% from other races, and 0.6% from two or more races. Hispanic or Latino of any race were 1.0%.

Of the 675 households, 29.5% had children under the age of 18 living with them, 52.1% were married couples living together, 8.7% had a female householder with no husband present, 4.3% had a male householder with no wife present, and 34.8% were non-families. 30.8% of households were one person and 16.6% were one person aged 65 or older. The average household size was 2.29 and the average family size was 2.83.

The median age was 42.4 years. 23.6% of residents were under the age of 18; 6.9% were between the ages of 18 and 24; 22.7% were from 25 to 44; 26.5% were from 45 to 64; and 20.2% were 65 or older. The gender makeup of the city was 48.5% male and 51.5% female.

2000 census
At the 2000 census there were 1,550 people, 659 households, and 432 families living in the city. The racial makeup of the city was 98.65% White, 0.06% African American, 0.58% Native American, 0.39% Asian, and 0.32% from two or more races. Hispanic or Latino of any race were 0.06%.

Of the 659 households, 28.7% had children under the age of 18 living with them, 55.4% were married couples living together, 5.8% had a female householder with no husband present, and 34.4% were non-families. 30.3% of households were one person and 19.0% were one person aged 65 or older. The average household size was 2.35 and the average family size was 2.93.

Age spread: 24.1% under the age of 18, 6.5% from 18 to 24, 26.9% from 25 to 44, 19.2% from 45 to 64, and 23.4% 65 or older. The median age was 40 years. For every 100 females, there were 90.9 males. For every 100 females age 18 and over, there were 89.7 males.

The median household income was $35,000 and the median family income  was $42,679. Males had a median income of $28,942 versus $19,954 for females. The per capita income for the city was $18,746. About 5.2% of families and 7.3% of the population were below the poverty line, including 6.2% of those under age 18 and 9.0% of those age 65 or over.

Education
It is within the MFL MarMac Community School District. The district formed on July 1, 1994, with the merger of the Mar-Mac and M-F-L districts.

Notable people

 Leighton Abel, Iowa state politician and businessman
 Alexander Gardner, photographer
 Raef LaFrentz, basketball player

References

External links

  
City-Data Comprehensive Statistical Data and more about Monona

Cities in Iowa
Cities in Clayton County, Iowa